The 2022–23 figure skating season began on July 1, 2022 and will end on June 30, 2023. During this season, elite skaters will compete on the ISU Championship level at the 2023 European, Four Continents, World Junior, and World Championships. They also competed at elite events such as the Grand Prix and Junior Grand Prix series, culminating in the Grand Prix Final, and the ISU Challenger Series.

From March 1, 2022 onwards, the International Skating Union banned all figure skaters and officials from Russia and Belarus from attending any international competitions following the 2022 Russian invasion of Ukraine.

The season is the first under newly elected ISU President Kim Jae-youl and ISU Vice President for Figure Skating Benoît Lavoie.

Season notes

Age eligibility 
Skaters are eligible to compete in ISU events on the junior or senior levels according to their age:

 Background
At the ISU Congress held in Phuket, Thailand in June 2022, members of the ISU Council accepted a proposal to gradually increase the minimum age limit for senior competition to 17 years old beginning from the 2024–25 season; to avoid forcing skaters who had already competed in the senior category to return to juniors, the age limit remained unchanged during the 2022–23 season, before increasing to 16 years old during the 2023–24 season, and then 17 years old during the 2024–25 season. Delegates also considered removing the word "senior" from the title of any official ISU events. Although there had been previous proposals to increase the age limit, the 2022 vote gained traction following the doping scandal of then 15-year-old Kamila Valieva of Russia at the 2022 Winter Olympics.

Death of Dmytro Sharpar
On 23 January 2023, Ukrainian media reported that 25-year-old former pair skater Dmytro Sharpar had been killed near Bakhmut, where the Ukrainian army was defending against invading Russian forces (see Battle of Bakhmut). Born 21 December 1997 in Kharkiv, Sharpar skated for Ukraine in partnership with Anastasia Pobizhenko at the 2016 Winter Youth Olympics in Norway.

Changes 

If skaters of different nationalities form a team, the ISU requires that they choose one country to represent.Date refers to date when the change occurred or, if not available, the date when the change was announced.

Partnership changes

Retirements

Coaching changes

Nationality changes

Competitions 

Scheduled competitions:

 Key

Cancelled 
Several competitions were cancelled by either the ISU, the host federation, or the local government due to the Armenia–Azerbaijan clashes, COVID-19 pandemic, Russian invasion of Ukraine, Turkey–Syria earthquakes and other reasons.

International medalists

Men

Women

Pairs

Ice dance

Records and achievements

Records 

Prior to the 2022–23 season, the ISU record scores stood as follows:

Senior

Junior 
The following new junior ISU best scores were set during this season:

Achievements 
 ISU Championships
  Sara Conti / Niccolò Macii (gold at 2023 Europeans) are the first Italian pair team to win an ISU Championships event.
  Anastasiia Gubanova (gold at 2023 Europeans) won Georgia's first ISU Championships title at the senior level in any discipline.
  Loena Hendrickx (silver at 2023 Europeans) is the first Belgian women's singles skater to win a medal at the European Championships.
  Riku Miura / Ryuichi Kihara (gold at 2023 Four Continents) are the first Japanese pair team to win an ISU Championships event and the first Japanese pair team to win a medal at the Four Continents Championships.
 In the women's free skating at 2023 Junior Worlds,  Kim Yu-jae became the twenty-fourth woman to successfully land a triple Axel in international competition.
  Kateřina Mrázková / Daniel Mrázek (gold at 2023 Junior Worlds) are the first Czech Republic's ice dance team to win an ISU Championships event. They also broke the junior record for the combined score.
  Hannah Lim / Ye Quan (silver at 2023 Junior Worlds) are the first South Korean and the first Asian ice dance team to win a World Junior Championships medal.
  Naoki Rossi (silver at 2023 Junior Worlds) earned the highest placement for a Swiss men's single skater at the World Junior Championships.

 ISU Grand Prix and Junior Grand Prix

 ISU Challenger Series and senior Bs
 In the men's free skating at 2022 U.S. Classic,  Ilia Malinin became the first man to successfully land a quadruple Axel in international competition.
 In the women's free skating at 2022 Lombardia Trophy,  Rinka Watanabe became the twenty-second woman to successfully land a triple Axel in international competition.
 In the junior women's free skating at 2023 Dragon Trophy,  Inga Gurgenidze became the twenty-third woman to successfully land a triple Axel in international competition.

Season's best scores

Men

Best total score

Best short program score

Best free skating score

Women

Best total score

Best short program score

Best free skating score

Pairs

Best total score

Best short program score

Best free skating score

Ice dance

Best total score

Best rhythm dance score

Best free dance score

Highest element scores 
GOE = Grade of Execution
BV = Base value

Note: An 'x' after the base value means that the base value has been multiplied by 1.1 because the jump was executed in the second half of the program. A 'q' means that the jump was landed on the quarter (missing rotation of exactly one quarter revolution and receives full base value). A '!' means an unclear edge on the takeoff of the jump.

Men

Highest valued single jumps

Highest valued combos/sequences

Women

Highest valued single jumps

Highest valued sequences/combos

Pairs

Highest valued twists

Highest valued throw jumps

Highest valued lifts

Highest valued jump sequences/combos

World Standings and Season's World Ranking

Current World Standings (top 30)

Men 
.

Women 
.

Pairs 
.

Ice dance 
.

Current Season's World Ranking (top 30)

Men 
.

Women 
.

Pairs 
.

Ice dance 
.

Notes

References 

Seasons in figure skating

Figure skating